The 459th Air Refueling Wing  is a wing of the Air Force Reserve Command of the United States Air Force. It is assigned to the Fourth Air Force and stationed at Joint Base Andrews, Maryland. If mobilized, the wing would be gained by the Air Mobility Command. The wing flies and maintains Boeing KC-135 Stratotankers, providing air refueling.

The wing, over the years, is a six-time recipient of the Air Force Outstanding Unit Award. There are about 1,200 traditional Reservists stationed at the wing. A full-time civilian and Air Reserve Technician staff of approximately 230 personnel provide wing day-to-day administration and management.

Units
The 459th Air Refueling Wing consists of the following major units:
 459th Operations Group
756th Air Refueling Squadron
459th Aeromedical Evacuation Squadron
 459th Maintenance Group
459th Maintenance Operations Flight
459th Aircraft Maintenance Squadron
459th Maintenance Squadron
 459th Mission Support Group
69th Aerial Port Squadron
459th Force Support Squadron
459th Logistics Readiness Squadron
459th Security Forces Squadron 
759th Logistics Readiness Flight*459th Medical Group
459th Aerospace Medicine Squadron
459th Aeromedical Staging Squadron

History
The World War II predecessor to the 459th Air Refueling Wing was the 459th Bombardment Group.  The 459th Air Refueling Wing is entitled to display the honors of the group by temporary bestowal.

Activation in the Air Force Reserve
The reserve flying mission began at Andrews Air Force Base in the summer of 1954, when the 756th Troop Carrier Squadron was activated and equipped with Curtiss C-46 Commando aircraft and began training under the supervision of the 2259th Air Force Reserve Combat Training Center. Nearly 8 months later, the unit had grown enough to activate its parent, the 459th Troop Carrier Wing.

In the summer of 1956, the wing participated in Operation Sixteen Ton during its two weeks of active duty training.  Sixteen Ton was performed entirely by reserve troop carrier units and moved United States Coast Guard equipment From Floyd Bennett Naval Air Station to Isla Grande Airport in Puerto Rico and San Salvador in the Bahamas.  After the success of this operation, the wing began to use inactive duty training periods for Operation Swift Lift, transporting high priority cargo for the Air Force and Operation Ready Swap, transporting aircraft engines between Air Materiel Command's depots.

In 1958, the 2259th Center was inactivated and some of its personnel were absorbed by the wing. In place of active duty support for reserve units, ConAC adopted the Air Reserve Technician program, in which a cadre of the unit consisted of full-time personnel who were simultaneously civilian employees of the Air Force and also held military rank as members of the reserves.

Detached Squadron Concept
During the first half of 1955, the Air Force began detaching Air Force Reserve squadrons from their parent wing locations to separate sites. Communities were more likely to accept the smaller squadrons than the large wings and the location of separate squadrons in smaller population centers would facilitate recruiting and manning.  The wing's 757th Troop Carrier Squadron, which was activated in April 1955 was located at Byrd Field, Virginia, rather than at Andrews. was one of the first three squadrons activated under this program. When the wing activated its third flying squadron, the 758th Troop Carrier Squadron, in 1957, it was located at Greater Pittsburgh Airport, Pennsylvania. In November 1957, the 757th relocated from Byrd Field, which also hosted an Air National Guard group, to Youngstown Municipal Airport, Ohio.

In April 1959, the wing reorganized under the Dual Deputy system.  Its 459th Troop Carrier Group was inactivated and the 756th, 757th and 758th Troop Carrier Squadrons were assigned directly to the wing.

Activation of groups under the wing
Although the dispersal of flying units was not a problem when the entire wing was called to active service, mobilizing a single flying squadron and elements to support it proved difficult.  This weakness was demonstrated in the partial mobilization of reserve units during the Berlin Crisis of 1961 To resolve this, at the start of 1962, ConAC determined to reorganize its reserve wings by establishing groups with support elements for each of its troop carrier squadrons.  This reorganization would facilitate mobilization of elements of wings in various combinations when needed. However, as this plan was entering its implementation phase, another partial mobilization occurred for the Cuban Missile Crisis.  The formation of troop carrier groups was delayed until January for wings that had not been mobilized. The 909th Troop Carrier Group at Andrews, the 910th Troop Carrier Group at Youngstown, and the 911th Troop Carrier Group at Pittsburgh were all assigned to the wing on 17 January.

Airlift Operations
On 1 July 1966, the 459th was redesignated the 459th Military Airlift Wing and converted to a strategic, long-range mission with the Douglas C-124 Globemaster II aircraft.

In June 1971, the 459th converted to the Lockheed C-130 Hercules and was redesignated as the 459th Tactical Airlift Wing. In December 1974, with the consolidation of all Air Force strategic and tactical airlift resources under a single manager, the 459th's active duty gaining command switched from Tactical Air Command to Military Airlift Command.

In July 1986, the wing converted to the Lockheed C-141B Starlifter aircraft and became the first Air Force Reserve unit to be equipped with own C-141s. The conversion resulted in an increase of wing personnel at Andrews from 900 to a level of almost 1,600.

In 1989, a 459th C-141 was the first aircraft to fly troops and supplies into Howard Air Force Base, Panama during Operation Just Cause; the following year the wing was named the Air Force Reserve Outstanding Unit of the Year by the Air Force Association.  In August 1990 wing aircrews were some of the first reservists activated in Support of Operation Desert Shield and many additional members were called to active service at the start of Operation Desert Storm with many deployed through the summer of 1991.

Post Cold War era 
In 1993, the 459th continued to support Operation Restore Hope and mobilized members in support of the operations in Somalia. The wing provided humanitarian airlift relief in Rwanda and in support of the Cuban refugees at Naval Base Guantanamo Bay, Cuba. In addition, 459th personnel supported Operation Uphold Democracy in Haiti as well as various other significant missions around the globe.

The 459th has been engaged in the Global War on Terrorism since September 2001. As a result of these operations, the Wing has participated in places around the globe to include: Iraq, Afghanistan, Qatar, Cuba, Bosnia, Kosovo, Turkey and Guam. Re-designated in 2003 as an air refueling wing, the 459th is equipped with KC-135Rs.

In 2017, the 459th worked with the Naval Air Systems Command to certify operationally the Navy's Boeing P-8 Poseidon Anti-Submarine Warfare aircraft for aerial refueling.

Lineage
 Established as the 459th Troop Carrier Wing, Medium on 30 December 1954
 Activated in the Reserve on 26 January 1955
 Redesignated 459th Military Airlift Wing on 1 July 1966
 Redesignated 459th Tactical Airlift Wing on 29 June 1971
 Redesignated 459th Military Airlift Wing on 1 July 1986
 Redesignated 459th Airlift Wing on 1 February 1992
 Redesignated 459th Air Refueling Wing on 1 October 2003

Assignments
 First Air Force, 26 January 1955
 Fourteenth Air Force, 25 March 1958
 Second Air Force Reserve Region, 15 August 1960
 First Air Force Reserve Region, 24 June 1966
 Eastern Air Force Reserve Region, 31 December 1969
 Fourteenth Air Force, 8 October 1976
 Twenty-Second Air Force, 1 July 1993
 Fourth Air Force, 1 April 2003 – present

Components
 Groups
 459th Troop Carrier Group (later, 459th Operations Group): 26 January 1955 – 14 April 1959; 1 August 1992 – present
 904th Troop Carrier Group (later 904th Military Airlift Group): 1 July 1966 – 26 January 1968; 2 June – 31 December 1969
 905th Military Airlift Group (later 905th Tactical Airlift Group): 25 February 1972 – 1 April 1974.
 907th Tactical Airlift Group (later 907th Airlift Group): 1 October 1989 – 1 October 1994
 909th Troop Carrier Group (later 909th Military Airlift Group): 17 January 1963 – 1 September 1975
 910th Troop Carrier Group (later 910th Tactical Fighter Group, 910th Tactical Airlift Group): 17 January 1963 – 1 July 1966; 1 April 1981 – 1 October 1989.
 911th Troop Carrier Group (later 911th Military Airlift Group): 17 January 1963 – 21 April 1971 (detached 1 – 21 April 1971)
 913th Tactical Airlift Group (later 913th Airlift Group): 8 January 1976 – 1 August 1992.
 915th Military Airlift Group: 26 January 1968 – 1 September 1969.
 918th Military Airlift Group: attached 1–20 April 1971, assigned 21 April 1971 – 1 July 1972
 919th Military Airlift Group (later 919th Tactical Airlift Group): 30 July 1971 – 1 December 1974
 920th Tactical Airlift Group: 25 April 1973 – 1 January 1976
 927th Tactical Airlift Group: 15 March 1976 – 1 July 1981

 Squadrons
 756th Troop Carrier Squadron (later 756th Military Airlift Squadron, 756th Airlift Squadron): 14 April 1959 – 17 January 1963, 1 September 1975 – 1 August 1992
 757th Troop Carrier Squadron: 8 April 1955 – 17 January 1963
 758th Troop Carrier Squadron: 14 April 1959 – 17 January 1963

Stations
 Andrews Air Force Base (later Joint Base Andrews), Maryland, 26 January 1955 – present

Aircraft 

 Curtiss C-46 Commando, 1955–1957
 Fairchild C-119 Flying Boxcar, 1957–1967
 Douglas C-124 Globemaster II, 1966–1972
 Lockheed RC-130 Hercules, 1971–1973

 Lockheed C-130 Hercules, 1971–1986
 de Havilland Canada C-7 Caribou, 1972
 Lockheed C-141 Starlifter, 1986–2003
 Boeing KC-135 Stratotanker, 2003 – present

References

 Notes

 Citations

Bibliography

Attribution

External links

 459th Air Refueling Wing

Military units and formations in Maryland
0459